Israel Halperin,  (January 5, 1911 – March 8, 2007) was a Canadian mathematician and social activist.

Early life and education
Israel Halperin was born in Toronto, Ontario, the son of Russian Jewish immigrants Solomon Halperin and Fanny Lundy. Halperin attended Malvern Collegiate Institute, Victoria University in the University of Toronto, graduated from the University of Toronto in 1932, and later was a graduate student of John von Neumann at Princeton University, where he received his doctorate in mathematics.

Early career
After completing his doctorate in mathematics at Princeton, Halperin took a faculty position at Queen's University beginning in 1939. Halperin joined the Canadian Army in 1942, serving until 1945 in Ottawa with the Canadian Armament Research and Development Establishment (CARDE). He then returned to Queen's.

Arrest and release
In February 1946, Halperin was arrested and accused of espionage in Canada, in connection with the defection of Igor Gouzenko, a Soviet cipher clerk, which occurred in Ottawa in September 1945. Gouzenko's defection and subsequent investigation showed that the Soviet Union was carrying on large-scale spying in Canada and the United States, including nuclear weapons espionage.

After some arduous questioning and confinement lasting several weeks, under a Royal Commission appointed by Justice Minister Louis St-Laurent, followed by a trial in early 1947, Halperin was eventually cleared and freed. He resumed teaching at Queen's, but not until 1948, following more legal hurdles which were raised by Queen's University leadership. Queen's Principal Robert Charles Wallace advocated his return.

Later career
Following von Neumann's death in 1957, Halperin completed two of his unfinished papers, leaving them under von Neumann's name alone.

Halperin taught at Queen's until 1966, earning tenure as a full professor. He then moved to the University of Toronto until his retirement in 1976, by which time he had authored more than 100 academic papers.

In 1980, the Israel Halperin Prize was setup by the Canadian Annual Symposium on Operator Theory and Operator Algebras to be awarded to a member of the Canadian mathematical community who has recently obtained a doctorate and has made contributions to operator theory or operator algebras, in honor of Halperin.

Halperin was awarded an honorary doctorate of laws from Queen's in 1989, and was made a Member of the Order of Canada, both for his humanitarian work.

Honors
Halperin was elected a Fellow of the Royal Society of Canada in 1953, and won the Henry Marshall Tory Medal in 1967.

Personal life
Halperin was the father of four children, all of whom went on to become professors: William Halperin, Connie Eaves, Stephen Halperin, and Mary Hannah.

Halperin died in 2007 at age 96.

Notes

References

Further reading

External links

1911 births
2007 deaths
Activists from Quebec
Activists from Toronto
Canadian activists
Canadian mathematicians
Canadian military personnel of World War II
Fellows of the Royal Society of Canada
Members of the Order of Canada
Academic staff of the Queen's University at Kingston
People from Westmount, Quebec
Scientists from Quebec
Scientists from Toronto
Princeton University alumni
University of Toronto alumni
Academic staff of the University of Toronto